Jones v Kernott [2011] UKSC 53 is a decision by the UK Supreme Court concerning the beneficial entitlement to a co-owned family home under a constructive trust. The court ruled there was a 90:10 split of ownership in favour of the main child-caring partner who contributed 80% of the equity to the home in which she lived. The non-resident partner had also ceased to pay bills and maintenance for the children for a considerable time.

Facts
Ms Jones and Mr Kernott met in 1980. In 1981 Ms Jones bought a caravan with the help of a bank loan, and in 1984 Mr Kernott moved into the caravan with her upon the birth of their first child. In May 1985 Ms Jones sold her caravan, and the parties bought 39 Badger Hall Avenue, Thundersley in Essex, for £30,000. Ms Jones contributed £6,000, and the balance was raised by an interest-only mortgage. The house was conveyed into their joint names. From this point on they shared payment of the household bills and the mortgage. In 1986 the couple's second child was born. The parties took out a loan for £2,000 for an extension which was mostly constructed by Mr Kernott.

In 1993 the couple separated, and Mr Kernott left Badger Hall Avenue. He stopped paying his share of the bills, and contributed little or nothing towards the maintenance of the children. In May 1996 the parties cashed in a life insurance policy and divided the proceeds. With his share of these Mr Kernott bought 114 Stanley Road, Benfleet in Essex, for £57,000.

In May 2006 Mr Kernott sought payment (realisation) of his alleged half-share in Badger Hall Avenue. Ms Jones responded by claiming under the Trusts of Land and Appointment of Trustees Act 1996 (TOLATA) for a declaration that she owned the entire beneficial interest in the property. Judge Dedman, after considering Oxley v Hiscock [2005] Fam 211 and Stack v Dowden [2007] 2 AC 432, held that while the interests of the parties at the outset might well have been that the property should be split jointly, those intentions had altered significantly over the years. He considered that the correct test was therefore what was "fair and just" between the parties, taking into account the whole course of dealing between them. He concluded, taking into account Mr Kernott's ceasing to pay any bills, the fact that Ms Jones contributed over 80% of the equity, and the lack of assistance provided by Mr Kernott relating to the maintenance of the children, that the correct split would be 90:10 in favour of Ms Jones.

Judgment

High Court
The appeal from the decision of Judge Dedman in the Southend on Sea County Court on 21 April 2008 was heard on 12 May 2009, judgment handed down on 10 July 2009, by Mr Nicholas Strauss QC in the High Court of Justice, Chancery Division who dismissed the appeal, as before awarding beneficiary shares in the Badger Hall Avenue house to Jones and Kernott in the ratio of 90:10.

Court of Appeal
On 26 May 2010, Her Majesty's Court of Appeal in England upheld the appeal, finding that the house was held in shares of 50/50. Rimer LJ gave the judgment.

Supreme Court
On 9 November 2011, the Supreme Court of the United Kingdom, overturning the Court of Appeal, held that Mr Kernott and Ms Jones would hold the shares in the house on trust in a ratio of 10% to 90%, to reflect their contributions to the home. Although the Supreme Court unanimously reached the decision, their Lordships concurred on different grounds. Lord Walker, Lady Hale and Lord Collins concluded that there are situations where it would be permissible to impute common intention, while Lord Kerr and Lord Wilson preferred to base their opinions on the fact that the court had the discretion to acknowledge constructive trust in such a manner because it was fair.

Lord Kerr said the following.

Lord Wilson said the following.

See also

English land law
Dyer v Dyer (1788) 2 Cox 92
Pettitt v Pettitt [1970] AC 777
Burns v Burns [1984] Ch 317
Abbott v Abbott [2007] UKPC 53
Geary v Rankine [2012] EWCA 555

Notes

References
N Gravells (ed), Landmark Cases in Land Law (2013)

External links
BBC News report

Supreme Court of the United Kingdom cases
2011 in case law
2011 in British law
English land case law